The Barreiro Rico Ecological Station is a state-level ecological station (ESEC) in the state of São Paulo, Brazil.

Location

The Barreiro Rico Ecological Station is in the municipality of Anhembi, São Paulo.
The ESEC is classified as IUCN protected area category Ia (strict nature reserve).
It is administered by the Fundação para Conservação e a Produção Florestal do Estado de São Paulo.

History

The Barreiro Rico Ecological Station was created by decree 51.381 of 19 December 2006 by Cláudio Lembo, governor of São Paulo state.
The purpose was to protect a remaining fragment of Atlantic Forest and its primate population.

Environment

The climate is Köppen type Cwa, with a rainy season from September to March and a dry season from April to August.
The forest block contains fragments of semi-deciduous submontane vegetation.
The ESEC was created to try to preserve this enclave and the surrounding forest.
Thirty species of medium and large mammals have been recorded, including seven that are threatened in São Paulo.

Notes

Sources

2006 establishments in Brazil
Ecological stations of Brazil
Protected areas of São Paulo (state)
Protected areas established in 2006
Protected areas of the Atlantic Forest